Asclepigenia (fl. 430 – 485 AD) was an Athenian philosopher and mystic.

Biography
Asclepigenia was the daughter of Plutarch of Athens. She studied and taught, alongside her brother Hierius, at the Neoplatonic school of Athens. The school contended with the more scientific school in Alexandria. Like other Neoplatonists of the time, she mainly studied Aristotle and Plato, but also  her father’s own philosophy. She lived in a historical context of turmoil due to the conflict between Neoplatonic metaphysics, which was taught in Plutarch’s academy, and Christianity, which had been gaining in popularity at the time.

Plutarch of Athens’ philosophy worked to unify the teachings of Aristotle and Plato, and by doing so brought together the opposing pagan ideas of theurgy and mysticism (magic), which he had learned from his father, Nestorius, and then passed that knowledge onto Asclepigenia. After Plutarch’s death, she inherited the school as well as how it was to go about teaching its students. Being an acclaimed philosopher at the school in Athens, Asclepigenia went on to teach Proclus, who became her best known student. She taught him not only the philosophies of Aristotle and Plato, but included teachings her father had passed solely on to her before his passing, in the arts of theurgy and pagan mysticism.

Being the expert in the theurgy, Asclepigenia taught from a metaphysical approach. She believed in there being five realms of reality: the One, Nature, Matter, Soul, and Intelligence. Like her father, she believed that every soul held a divine part inside itself, and that a union with the One, combined with magic, pagan thought of the deities, and meditation could result in true happiness for a person, as a way they could control their own fate. Her teachings to Proclus on theurgy, benefited him greatly as he went on to think and develop his own ideas. He also supposedly was able to practice theurgy in such a way that it cured his friend’s daughter, by use of  a divine intervention with one of the gods.

Asclepigenia continued to teach at the Academy after Proclus went on to perfect his theurgical thoughts and practices. Her most well known achievements were in the arts and practicing rituals in the Chaldean mysticism of theurgy, as well as exceptional thought in Platonic philosophy. She passed along many of Aristotle and Plato’s teachings to multiple students, including Plutarch. Her reverence in philosophy, as well as an astute female teacher, only adds to the value and importance of who she was in the Greek world. She contributed greatly to the development of Neoplatonic metaphysics and worked alongside many great philosophers, including her brother Hiero. Her advancements have impacted future thought on the practices of theurgy, as well as the arts and magic of the Chaldean mysticism. She is said to have died in the year 485 A.D.

References

5th-century Byzantine people
5th-century philosophers
Ancient Greek women philosophers
Neoplatonists in Athens
Ancient Roman philosophers
Roman-era Athenian women
Roman-era Athenian philosophers
5th-century Byzantine women
Late-Roman-era pagans